Woodlawn is a historic home located near Oilville, Goochland County, Virginia.  It is dated to the late 18th century, and is a two-story, five-bay brick structure with 12 fireplaces in the Federal style. It has a small porch supported on four evenly spaced square columns with Ionic order capitals added around 1810.  The house still has much of its original glass and original woodwork, and a formal boxwood garden with some of the box trees well over a century old.    A one-story frame kitchen and a long frame porch were both added in 1937.

This is the oldest of five historic houses in Virginia that are named "Woodlawn". Others can be found listed under Woodlawn, Virginia.

It was listed on the National Register of Historic Places in 1971.

References

Houses on the National Register of Historic Places in Virginia
Federal architecture in Virginia
Houses in Goochland County, Virginia
National Register of Historic Places in Goochland County, Virginia